This is the discography for the American jazz musician Elvin Jones.

As leader/co-leader

As sideman

References

External links 
 Elvin Jones at Discogs

Discographies of American artists
Jazz discographies